The following lists events that happened during 1963 in Chile.

Incumbents
President of Chile: Jorge Alessandri

Events

January
1 January – The Deportes Ovalle football club is founded.

February
The fourth version of the Viña del Mar International Song Festival takes place.

April
7 April - Municipal elections are held, which largely favored the Christian Democrats.
21 April - The first prize of Miss World Chile is given to Maria Pilar Aguirre Gómez.
30 April - The Jackal of Nahueltoro is murdered under Capital punishment , convicted of murdering his former partner and his five children (only hers).

May
6 May - an explosion of a cyclopropane balloon in the San Borja Arriaran Hospital in Santiago caused the death of 6 people (2 surgeons, 2 patients and 2 anesthesiologists) and left another 2 surgeons and 12 assistants seriously injured.

July
3 July - The first edition of the Juan Pinto Duran Cup is held.

December
16 December - The statutes and regulations of Rugby in Chile, founded 10 years before, were made official.

Births
16 January – Tomás Jocelyn-Holt
11 March – Hugo González
13 March – Aníbal González
24 March – Iván Morovic
25 March – Jaime Vera
21 April – Eduardo Vilches
23 April – Fernando Luis Capurro

Deaths
8 December – Juana Rosa Aguirre (b. 1877)

References 

 
Years of the 20th century in Chile
Chile